The  is a Japanese international school in Colombo, Sri Lanka. It was established on 2 September 1966 (Shōwa 41). It was previously located elsewhere in Colombo.

Notes

External links

 Japanese School in Colombo 
 Japanese School in Colombo  (Archive)

Schools in Colombo
Colombo
International schools in Sri Lanka
Educational institutions established in 1966
1966 establishments in Ceylon